Janosch Dziwior (born 19 September 1974) is a German football coach and a former player.

Career
Dziwior was born in Knurów, Poland. He made his debut on the professional league level in the Bundesliga for 1. FC Köln on 17 February 1995 when he started in a game against Eintracht Frankfurt.

References

External links
 

1974 births
Living people
People from Knurów
German footballers
Association football defenders
German football managers
Polish emigrants to Germany
1. FC Köln players
1. FC Köln II players
Eintracht Braunschweig players
Fortuna Düsseldorf players
KFC Uerdingen 05 players
FC Gütersloh 2000 players
Bundesliga players
2. Bundesliga players